Rashdin (also Romanized as Rashdīn; also known as Pashti, Rashatīn, Rashtīn, and Rashty) is a village in Minjavan-e Gharbi Rural District, Minjavan District, Khoda Afarin County, East Azerbaijan Province, Iran. At the 2006 census, its population was 30, in 4 families.

References 

Populated places in Khoda Afarin County